Knauers is a community in Brecknock Township, Berks County, Pennsylvania, United States, 3.4 miles from Adamstown and 0.9 miles from Alleghenyville.

References

Unincorporated communities in Berks County, Pennsylvania
Unincorporated communities in Pennsylvania